Borj El Kebir, also known as Borj El Ghazi Mustapha, is an ancient castle in Houmt El Souk, Tunisia on the island of Djerba. It is the largest and best preserved local castle, and is one of the most visited historical sites on the island.

Etymology
The name Borj El Ghazi Mustapha comes from the Qaid who settled in Djerba in 1559. This qaid extended the castle and gives it its actual architecture.

Localistation 
The castle is located in the north of Houmt El Souk near the fishing port.

History
It was built in the end of the 14th century over the ruins of the ancient Roman city of Griba, after the deportation of the soldiers of Alfonso V of Aragon following the orders of the hafsid sultan of Tunisia.
In 1450, the castle got extended.
On July 28, 1881, during the French occupation, French troops settled in the castle after invading the island.

In 1903, it became a property of the Tunisian authorities who gave it the status of a national historical monument on March 15, 1904 and transformed it into a museum. Restoration started in 1969 and was completed by the early 1980s.

Description 
The borj has a rectangular form.

Nowadays, the monument has two mausoleums: Sidi saad, and Ghazi Mustapha, for Ghazi Mustapha Bey.

Gallery

References 

Djerba
Castles in Tunisia